Indian Punjabi may refer to:
 Punjabis in India
 the variety of the Punjabi language used in India